Charles Darling may refer to:

 Charles Hial Darling (1859–1944), United States Assistant Secretary of the Navy
 Charles Henry Darling (1809–1870),  British colonial governor
 Charles Darling, 1st Baron Darling (1849–1936), English lawyer, politician and judge
 Chuck Darling (born Charles Frick Darling 1930), American basketball player
 Charles Darling (pool player), American artistic pool and trick shot world champion
 Charles Darling (American football), college football and baseball player
 Charles William Darling (1830–1905), American soldier and author